Pre Viam is the third studio album by the Italian rock band Jacula, released in 2011 nearly four decades after previous work. In the interim, the band's leader, Antonio Bartoccetti, had formed a new band, Antonius Rex. When Bartoccetti brought Jacula back to the recording studio, the original organist, Charles Tiring, had been dead since 1979. Original keyboardist Doris Norton was replaced with Bartoccetti's son, Rexanthony.

Track listing 
LP-vinyl playlist:
 Jacula Is Back
 Pre Viam
 Black Lady Kiss
 Abandoned
 Devien Folle
 In Rain
 Godwitch
 Possaction

CD-Digipack playlist:
 Jacula Is Back
 Pre Viam
 Black Lady Kiss
 Devien Folle
 In Rain
 Godwitch
 Possaction
 18 Veritates (VIDEO)

Line-up 2011
 Antonio Bartoccetti - vocals, guitars
 Rexanthony - piano, synthesiser, keyboards
 Florian Gormann -drums

Guest musicians 
 Blacklady - vocals on "Blacklady Kiss", "In Rain" and "Godwitch"
 Katia Stazio - vocals on "Pre Viam" and "Deviens Folle"

References 

2011 albums
Antonious Rex albums